The 1900 All-Ireland Senior Football Championship Final was the thirteenth All-Ireland Final and the deciding match of the 1900 All-Ireland Senior Football Championship, an inter-county Gaelic football tournament for the top teams in Ireland. 

Tipperary were the winners in a very one-sided final in which they beat London by 3-7 to 0-2.

It was Tipperary's third All-Ireland football title following success in 1889 and 1895.

References

Gaelic football
All-Ireland Senior Football Championship Finals
London county football team matches
Tipperary county football team matches